Fregola is a 1948 Austrian musical film directed by Harald Röbbeling and starring Marika Rökk, Rudolf Prack and Siegfried Breuer. It was a comeback film for Rökk, one of the most popular stars of the Third Reich, who hadn't made a film since 1944. The film was popular with West German audiences, particularly amongst women. It was shot at the Sievering Studios in Vienna.

Cast
 Marika Rökk as Fregola  
 Rudolf Prack as Santos  
 Siegfried Breuer as Pablo Mendez  
 Gustav Waldau as Flock  
 Josef Meinrad as Dr. Wegscheider  
 Theodor Danegger as Boulanger  
 Hans Jungbauer as Dr. Ribault 
 Jo Fürst as Don Fernandez 
 Erich Schiffer as Solotänzer 
 Otto Gottsberger as Solotänzer  
 Hugo Gottschlich as Brunet

References

Bibliography 
 Bergfelder, Tim. International Adventures: German Popular Cinema and European Co-Productions in the 1960s. Berghahn Books, 2005.
 Dassanowsky, Robert. Austrian Cinema: A History. McFarland & Company Incorporated Pub, 2005.

External links 
 

1948 films
Austrian musical films
Austrian black-and-white films
1948 musical films
1940s German-language films
Sascha-Film films
Films shot at Sievering Studios